Sawong Mongkolrit (born 8 February 1935) is a Thai boxer. He competed in the men's light welterweight event at the 1960 Summer Olympics. At the 1960 Summer Olympics, he lost to Kim Deuk-bong of South Korea.

References

External links
 

1935 births
Living people
Sawong Mongkolrit
Sawong Mongkolrit
Boxers at the 1960 Summer Olympics
Sawong Mongkolrit
Light-welterweight boxers